The Manchester derby refers to football matches between Manchester City and Manchester United, first contested in 1881. The teams have played 189 matches in all competitions, United winning 78, City 58, and the remaining 53 having been drawn. Amongst the most successful clubs in England, they have won a combined 96 honours: 67 for Manchester United and 29 for Manchester City.

History

The first meeting between the two teams occurred on 12 November 1881, when St. Mark's (West Gorton) – who would later become Manchester City – hosted Newton Heath LYR – who would later become Manchester United. The game finished 3–0 in favour of Newton Heath and was described by the Ashton Reporter as "a pleasant game". At this time, the clubs were just two of many fledgling sides in the Manchester area, and the fixture had no special significance. Both clubs grew in stature as the 1880s progressed, leading to their first meeting of the 1890s being billed as "a meeting of two local clubs, [Ardwick (City)] just rising to the highest standard in the football world whilst [Newton Heath] are nearly in the front rank". The pair became the dominant teams in the Manchester area; the winner of the Manchester Cup was either Newton Heath or Ardwick every year between 1888 and 1893. Both teams joined the Football Alliance, a short-lived rival to the Football League. During this period both clubs made unsuccessful attempts to gain election to the League (Newton Heath in 1889, 1890 and 1891; Ardwick in 1891). Admission to the Football League finally came in 1892. Newton Heath joined the First Division, and Ardwick the new Second Division.

Early years
The first Football League meeting between the teams came in the 1894–95 season, Newton Heath beating Manchester City 5–2 at Hyde Road. In the late 1890s, Scottish brothers Billy and Matthew Gillespie played on opposite sides in the fixture on three occasions. The first meeting between the clubs to take place at the highest level of English football occurred in December 1906, a 3–0 City win in a First Division match for which the gate receipts exceeded £1,000, a very large figure for the era. At this time City were suffering the after-effects of a financial scandal in which the club were found guilty of making off-balance sheet payments to players. As a result, seventeen players were suspended and banned from ever representing the club again, including the core of the team which had won the 1904 FA Cup. When the suspensions ended in January 1907, four players (Jimmy Bannister, Herbert Burgess, Billy Meredith and Sandy Turnbull) joined United, where they helped United gain their first league title in 1908. In contrast to modern antipathy, the transfers were generally welcomed for helping a fellow Manchester club. The following season Turnbull became the first player to be sent off in a derby.

Before the Second World War, many football supporters in Manchester watched City one week and United the next. After the war, a stronger rivalry developed and following both teams became uncommon.

Floodlights
The first floodlit Manchester derby was played on 26 February 1889 at the Belle Vue Athletic Ground. Wells electric lights were placed around the ground and a crowd of 10,000 watched Newton Heath defeat Ardwick 3–2. The match was played in aid of the Hyde Coal Mine disaster.

The first competitive floodlit derby was the 1956 FA Charity Shield match, as Manchester United were defending league champions and Manchester City were FA Cup holders. The game was a break with tradition as Charity Shield games were typically played at the home ground of the League Champions, but as Old Trafford had yet to install lights, the game was played at Maine Road.

1970s
Manchester derbies in the 1970s saw two controversial incidents. In the December 1970 derby, a tackle by United's George Best broke the leg of City's Glyn Pardoe; the severity of the injury almost resulted in the City defender losing his leg. The following season, an entertaining 3–3 draw saw Francis Lee accuse Best of diving and emphasised the point to the referee by throwing himself theatrically to the floor. The first derby of the 1973–74 season saw Mike Doyle and Lou Macari each receive a red card in a dour contest which finished 0–0 at Maine Road. Both players refused to leave the pitch, leading the referee to take both teams back to the dressing room until the two players accepted their dismissals.

Denis Law game

The return fixture came at Old Trafford on the penultimate day of the season (United still had an away game to play at Stoke) with United trying to avoid relegation with a win, although they were also relying on Norwich beating Birmingham that day for their result to matter. After 80 minutes, with no score, Francis Lee played the ball towards former United player Denis Law who was standing with his back to goal. Law back-heeled the ball past goalkeeper Alex Stepney into the net. This was Law's last appearance in league football, announcing his retirement soon after. In the closing minutes of the match, United supporters invaded the pitch and forced an abandonment. However, the result stood, and other results meant that United would have still been relegated if the match had ended in a United win or a draw.

United returned to the First Division a year later. The rest of the decade brought generally good fortunes for the two sides, as City won the League Cup in 1976 and were league runners-up a year later, while United reached three FA Cup finals in four seasons, although they had only one win in the competition.

1980s
The 1980s began with a 2–2 draw at Old Trafford between the two sides on 27 September 1980. It was the beginning of a relatively frustrating season in the league for United, who sacked manager Dave Sexton at the end of the campaign, while City dismissed manager Malcolm Allison soon afterwards and improved in the league under his successor John Bond, also reaching the FA Cup Final.

By 1982–83, however, any suggestions that City were a better side than United were silenced as United finished third in the league and won the FA Cup, while City were relegated. The Old Trafford derby on 23 October 1982 ended in a 2–2 draw, but United won the return game at Maine Road 2–1 on 5 March 1983.

City regained their First Division status for the 1985–86 season, and hosted United at Maine Road on 14 September 1985. United won this game 3–0, to extend their winning start to the league season to eight games. They would go on to win all of their opening 10 games and lead the First Division table into the new year, but eventually finished fourth. Although City finished 15th in the league this season, they did come to Old Trafford on 22 March 1986 and hold the hosts to a 2–2 draw, costing them two vital points as their title hopes continued to fade.

1986–87 brought relegation for City, while United finished 11th in a season which saw them replace Ron Atkinson with Alex Ferguson as manager on 6 November 1986. One of Atkinson's last games in charge of United was the visit to Maine Road in the league on 25 October, which ended in a 1–1 draw. Alex Ferguson first faced City as United manager on 10 January 1987 in the third round of the FA Cup, which United won 1–0. The league clash at Old Trafford came on 7 March 1987, which United won 2–0 to continue their improvement in form under Ferguson and push City closer to eventual relegation.

The 1980s ended on a high note for City as they won promotion back to the First Division in 1989 and were paired with United for the derby match at Maine Road on 23 September 1989, just weeks into the 1989–90 season. City defeated United 5–1, but this would be their last win over United for 13 years.

1990s
Goalkeeper Peter Schmeichel, who played for both United and City, can claim an unbeaten record in derby games – United were unbeaten during his 10 matches keeping goal for them against City, while in his single season at Maine Road, City beat United at home and picked up a point at Old Trafford.

However, in the 1990s, United dominated the fixture, going unbeaten in derbies for the full decade. In 1990–91, with both Manchester clubs competing in the top half of the table but not looking like real title contenders, the Maine Road clash in October delivered a pulsating 3–3 draw, but the return match at Old Trafford in early May saw United win 1–0 and the only goal of the game came from 17-year-old winger Ryan Giggs, scoring the first senior goal of what would prove to be an illustrious and uniquely successful career. The 1991–92 derbies were uneventful – a goalless draw at Maine Road in mid-November and a 1–1 draw at Old Trafford in early April. United finished the season runners-up after leading the league for much of the season, finally buckling under fixture congestion and a shortage of goals in the second half of the campaign.

The first Manchester derby following the creation of the Premier League for the 1992–93 season was a 2–1 win for United at Old Trafford on 6 December 1992. Making his United debut on that day was new signing Eric Cantona, who would go on to score eight goals in Manchester derbies over the next four seasons – the first in the return match at Maine Road that March which ended in a 1–1 draw. 1993–94 saw one of the finest Manchester derbies ever, when United overturned a 2–0 deficit at Maine Road to win 3–2, with Eric Cantona scoring twice. Cantona scored a double on St George's Day as United won 2–0 at Old Trafford. Cantona was on target again in the next Manchester derby in November 1994, though it was Andrei Kanchelskis who stole the show with a hat-trick in a 5–0 win. United won the return game 3–0 at Maine Road three months later. 1995–96 was the last season of the millennium which brought a Manchester derby, as City were relegated at the end of the season. The first derby of the season came at Old Trafford in mid-October with a 1–0 win for United in which Paul Scholes, still only 20, scored the only goal of the game and only a string of superb saves from United goalkeeper Peter Schmeichel prevented City from gaining a surprise win. The return game in early April saw United win 3–2 at Maine Road, with yet another goal from Cantona, who had netted a highly controversial penalty after Uwe Rosler had put City 1–0 FA Cup fifth round two months earlier, which United went on to win 2–1.

2000s
Three years later, in the first Old Trafford derby of the new millennium in April 2001, saw the culmination of a long-standing feud between Roy Keane and Alfie Haaland, which Keane received a red card for making a knee-high tackle on Haaland. The feud started in 1997, when United captain Keane suffered a cruciate ligament injury when he fouled Haaland (then playing for Leeds, a team that also have an unpleasant rivalry with United). As Keane lay on the ground, Haaland accused him of feigning injury. The game ended in a 1–1 draw; United were already league champions and City's two dropped points brought them closer to eventual relegation, which was confirmed in the penultimate game of the season. It was the first time in nine years that City had come away from Old Trafford unbeaten, and the first time in eight years that they had been unbeaten by United home or away in any competition.

In his autobiography, published in 2002, Keane admitted that the challenge was a premeditated attempt to injure, an admission which resulted in a £150,000 fine and a five-match ban during the autumn of that year.

On 9 November 2002, City, managed by Kevin Keegan, won the last derby at Maine Road 3–1, with Shaun Goater scoring his 100th and 101st goals for the club, and Nicolas Anelka scoring the other. This was City's first win over United since the 5–1 victory in 1989, ending a 13-year barren run for the blue half of Manchester. City would later go on to draw at Old Trafford in the same season 1–1, Shaun Goater again scoring the goal. This was the first season since 1991–92 that City had been unbeaten by United in either of their league meetings.

Goater also had a second goal disallowed for handball, which would have handed City their first derby double over United since 1970 and their first win at Old Trafford since the "Denis Law game" of 1974. City followed this up by winning the first ever derby match at their new stadium, the City of Manchester Stadium, 4–1, with goals from Robbie Fowler, Jon Macken, Trevor Sinclair and Shaun Wright-Phillips.

The 2007–08 derby games were both won by Manchester City, 1–0 at the City of Manchester Stadium on 19 August 2007, and 2–1 at Old Trafford on 10 February 2008 (four days after the 50th anniversary of the Munich air disaster; a well-observed one-minute silence preceded the match). Darius Vassell and Benjani scored for City in the 24th and 45th minutes respectively, and Michael Carrick scored a consolation goal for United in the 90th minute. It was the first time since April 1974 that City had beaten United in the league at Old Trafford and the first time they had won both league derby games since the 1969–70 season. United prevented City from winning a third consecutive derby match in the first derby of the 2008–09 season, Wayne Rooney scoring the game's only goal. Cristiano Ronaldo was sent off in the same game for a bizarre handball. Ronaldo and Carlos Tevez then scored in the return match at Old Trafford to give United a 2–0 win.

2010s

The seasons following City's takeover in 2008–09, saw two well-contested semi-final fixtures (League Cup and FA Cup) between the clubs. Controversy was generated prior to the start of the 2009–10 season, when City signed Carlos Tevez after his contract with United ended and erected a billboard reading "Welcome to Manchester" at the top of Deansgate. The billboard provoked Alex Ferguson into claiming City were a "small club with a small mentality" and subsequently called them "noisy neighbours" during the season.

The 2009–10 season featured some tense matches, including two League Cup semi-final legs. Sir Alex Ferguson proclaimed the 2009–10 Manchester derby at Old Trafford as "probably [...] the best derby of all time". Manchester United won this game 4–3 after Manchester City had equalised three times only for Michael Owen to score the winning goal after 95 minutes. The match was voted the greatest Premier League game at the Premier League 20 Seasons Awards in 2012. The sides were drawn against each other in the League Cup semi-finals, meaning a further two games. City won the first leg 2–1 after overturning a 1–0 deficit made by Ryan Giggs with goals from Carlos Tevez. United went 2–0 up in the second leg via Paul Scholes and Michael Carrick before Tevez made it 2–1, levelling the tie and setting the game up for extra time. However, Rooney scored a stoppage time header which won the tie for United and took them to their second consecutive League Cup final. On 17 April 2010, United beat City 1–0 thanks to a 90th minute Scholes goal, but the victory was to little avail as it was not enough to help United chase Chelsea down to win the Premier League title, pipping United by a point.

The 2010–11 season featured three Manchester derbies, with one victory for United, one draw and one victory for City. The victory for United was at Old Trafford, where Wayne Rooney defined the game through a spectacular bicycle kick, this game gave United some space to overcome the rest of the season and get their 19th league title. City's win came in the FA Cup semi-final, knocking United out on the way to their ninth FA Cup Final, and their first trophy since 1976. Consequently, the Community Shield that began the 2011–12 season was a Manchester derby, as United won the league the same day City won the FA Cup, 14 May. United won the Community Shield 3–2 at Wembley, coming from two goals behind to clinch the Shield in stoppage time.

On 23 October 2011, Manchester City beat United 6–1 at Old Trafford, giving the latter their first defeat of the season. Jonny Evans was sent off in the 47th minute after fouling Mario Balotelli, with the score at 1–0 to City. United pulled a goal back at 3–0 down before three goals for City sealed their victory. The 6–1 score was the biggest defeat suffered by Manchester United against City at Old Trafford since the 5–0 loss in 1955. It was also the first time since 1926 that City had scored six at Old Trafford, when the score that day also finished 6–1.

United and City met for the third time in the season in the third round of the FA Cup, resulting in a 3–2 win for United. The scoring opened in the tenth minute as Wayne Rooney headed neatly past stand-in keeper Costel Pantilimon, before Vincent Kompany received a red card in the 12th minute for a challenge on Nani. United went 3–0 up by half time, and successfully battled off a second half comeback from City in which they scored twice. The game was notable for the re-emergence of Paul Scholes, who came out of retirement and replaced Nani in the 59th minute.

City beat United 1–0 at the City of Manchester Stadium on 30 April 2012, with Vincent Kompany scoring a header just before the half-time whistle. There was also a spat between City boss Roberto Mancini and Sir Alex Ferguson after a challenge on Danny Welbeck by Nigel de Jong. Ferguson claimed that Mancini harangued the fourth official Mike Jones throughout the match, while Mancini laughed off the incident, sarcastically claiming Ferguson never talks to, or harangues the referee – an offence Ferguson has been found guilty of on numerous occasions, most recently in 2011 for which he received a five-match ban. Consequently, the win put City top of the league on goal difference after being 8 points behind in the league in March. Only two wins against Newcastle United and Queens Park Rangers were required for City to win the league, which they subsequently achieved. City ultimately won the last six league matches to clinch the league title on goal difference – the first time a tie-breaker was used to decide the championship since 1988–89, and repeated the 1967–68 league season, when City pipped United to the title after both teams went into their final games level on points.

The first Manchester derby of the 2012–13 season was won by Manchester United in the dying minutes of the game. United went ahead with two early goals from Wayne Rooney, before City came back and levelled the match with goals from Yaya Touré and the equaliser from Pablo Zabaleta in the 86th minute. Robin van Persie scored from a free kick that took a deflection off of Samir Nasri in the 92nd minute, to seal the win and three points in the league. Manchester United's victory ended Manchester City's run of being unbeaten in 37 games. During the celebrations following the late winner by Robin van Persie, Rio Ferdinand was hit by a coin thrown by a fan, causing Ferdinand to suffer an injury near his left eye. Another fan invaded the pitch and attempted to confront Ferdinand, only to be restrained by Joe Hart. City won the second derby of the season at Old Trafford, the first time they had won two away derbies in a row since the 1970s.

The first Manchester derby of the 2013–14 season was won by City 4–1 at the City of Manchester Stadium on 22 September 2013. Sergio Agüero opened the scoring on the 16th minute followed by a goal from Yaya Touré just before half-time. In the second half, Agüero scored his second followed by a Samir Nasri goal three minutes later. Wayne Rooney scored a late free kick for United as a consolation goal. It was the first time in 26 years that the Derby had been contested by two new managers: Manuel Pellegrini for Manchester City and David Moyes for Manchester United. Manchester City went on to do the double over United with a third consecutive win at Old Trafford on 25 March 2014, and won the Premier League for the second time in three seasons. During the 2014–15 season, City defeated United 1–0 at City of Manchester Stadium in November 2014, but United won their next encounter at Old Trafford in April 2015 with a final score of 4–2, a game which City goalkeeper Joe Hart dubbed "one of my worst days in a Man City shirt".

The first derby of the 2015–16 campaign, contested at Old Trafford, ended in a 0–0 draw. This was the first time the derby had ended without any goals since 2010. United won the second derby of the season, hosted at the City of Manchester Stadium, after Marcus Rashford scored the only goal of the game at the 16-minute mark.

Both clubs had managerial changes prior to the start of the 2016–17 campaign, with José Mourinho taking over Manchester United and Pep Guardiola taking over Manchester City. City arguably took the bragging rights that season, winning 2–1 at Old Trafford on 10 September in the league before United won the League Cup tie 1–0 at Old Trafford en route to the title on 26 October and a goalless draw at the City of Manchester Stadium on 27 April in which Marouane Fellaini was sent off for headbutting Sergio Agüero. In the 2017–18 season, City won 2–1 at Old Trafford for the second year in a row on 10 December, and had the chance to win the league with victory over United at the City of Manchester Stadium on 7 April. They led 2–0 at half-time, but two goals from Paul Pogba and one from Chris Smalling meant City had to wait to secure the title; however, City's victory against Tottenham the following weekend, combined with a defeat for United against West Bromwich Albion the next day, meant City won the title with five games to play. City did the double over United the following season, winning 3–1 at the City of Manchester Stadium – their first home derby win since 2014 – and 2–0 at Old Trafford – their third away derby win in a row. In the 2019–20 campaign, United was again travelling first; goals from Marcus Rashford and Anthony Martial secured their first win in the first derby fixture of the season for the first time since 2012–13.

2020s
The late 2010s and early 2020s saw City reach unprecedented levels of success, winning the league in four out of five seasons under the management of Pep Guardiola. Most of these seasons were characterised by closely fought title battles between Liverpool and City, and United were able to finish a distant second to City on a couple of occasions. However, their derby games continued to be competitive and mostly unpredictable.

The first derbies of the 2020s came in a 2019–20 EFL Cup semi-final tie in January 2020. City's 3–1 win in the first leg at Old Trafford was enough to send them to their third successive EFL Cup final, as United were only able to produce a 1–0 win in the second leg at the City of Manchester Stadium; City went on to win their seventh EFL Cup, their third in a row and the fifth since 2014.

The first league derby in this decade came exactly a week after City's EFL Cup triumph in March 2020. Played at Old Trafford, goals from Anthony Martial and Scott McTominay completed United's first league double over City since 2009–10 and proved to be their last home match to be watched by spectators before the restrictions caused by the COVID-19 pandemic started.

The following COVID-19 affected season, the two clubs met once more in a EFL Cup semi-final. This was the fourth time the clubs had met at this stage of the competition and the third time in eleven years. For the second consecutive season, City came out on top, winning 2–0 at Old Trafford in a single-legged spectator-less fixture, thanks to goals from John Stones and Fernandinho, and so reached their ninth EFL Cup final, fourth consecutive final, and sixth in the previous eight seasons. In March 2021, United had their second successive league win at City for the first time since 2010, with another 2–0 victory and goals from Bruno Fernandes and Luke Shaw.

In 2021–22 City were able to end their run of derby home league defeats and complete their first double over United in three seasons, with a 2–0 victory at Old Trafford in November 2021, and a convincing 4–1 win at the Etihad in March 2022, with braces from both Kevin De Bruyne and Riyad Mahrez.
	
In the first derby of the 2022–23 league season, City beat United at home 6–3. It was the highest-scoring Manchester derby of all time. On 14 January 2023, United beat City at home 2–1 in the second derby of the season, with goals from Bruno Fernandes and Marcus Rashford.

Fans
Although both City and United fans currently view Liverpool as their main rivals, the rivalry between the two Manchester clubs intensified as football became tribal in the 1960s and 1970s, and strengthened again in the early 2010s with City's emergence as one of the top teams in England.

Both Manchester clubs are regarded as among the best in the world, with both consistently progressing to the latter stages of UEFA competitions in recent years and both are in the top 5 of football clubs by revenue. The city now viewed as a football city in similar vein to cities such as Madrid and Milan, although City's disappearance from the upper echelons of the league following their 1960s–70s heyday until their recent rise has led to the two teams being regarded as polar opposites, with City seen as the nouveau riche to United's old money.

The two sets of fans are traditionally diametrically opposed to each other, with City's fans accusing United of arrogance and of attempting to turn the Premier League into a closed shop for elite clubs only via manipulation of the rules and of the media while they in turn are accused of using their oil money as a route to success.

Additionally, and in a unique twist on a cross-city rivalry, both clubs' fans accuse each other of not representing their city, with the blue half of the city observing that their adversaries do not actually play in the city of Manchester (in Trafford) and therefore do not warrant their name, while the red half instead argue over which team has more fans inside of the city. City fans often ridicule United fans for being tourists in a play towards United's global fan base, stating that City is the club for the locals and United fans travel up from London or fly in from Europe and Asia for a day out. Following on from this City fans have often called United "plastics" or "glory supporters" again in reference to their on the field dominance over several decades that made the club hugely popular with football supporters outside of Manchester. In turn, owing to the growth of City's global status following their 2008 takeover which brought significant success on the field, United fans have said many "plastic" fans have jumped on City's bandwagon.

The most commonly used name by City fans to describe their cross-city rivals is the term "Rags", this is due to a period after World War II where United were given use of City's Maine Road stadium after Old Trafford had been bombed by the Luftwaffe. United at the time were so poor that they had to wear old kits that after a while started to resemble old rags. City fans refer to United's stadium as "The Swamp", while United fans refer to the City of Manchester Stadium as the "Emptyhad", in reference to the perceived low attendances attendance rates and visible light blue empty seats at some City home games. Of the 20 Premier League teams, Manchester City had the 6th highest average attendance in the 21/22 season, and the 15th highest as a percentage of stadium capacity.

Statistics
As of 14 January 2023, there have been 189 competitive meetings between the teams. United have won 78, City have won 58 and the remaining 53 games finished as draws.

The biggest victories have been to City, who have won 6–1 on two occasions in the official league (both times in the away fixture at Old Trafford); on 23 January 1926 and 23 October 2011. United beat City 7–1 in a War League match at Maine Road on 14 April 1941, but this is not considered an official fixture and thus the result is not counted as the biggest win in the derby. Both teams have won 5–0 once (City in 1955, United in 1994). The largest attendance for a Manchester derby was 78,000 on 20 September 1947, a time when both clubs were playing at Maine Road, as Old Trafford was being repaired following bomb damage sustained in the Second World War.

Top goalscorers
All statistics exclude the abandoned match from the 1960–61 season. Italics denote players still currently playing for either Manchester City or Manchester United.

Honours
City won their first honour in 1904 with victory in the FA Cup and United in 1908 with the Football League First Division title. There have been five occasions where City and United, finished champions and runners-up in the league, the 1967–68, 2011–12, 2012–13, 2017–18 and 2020–21 seasons. On the first two occasions City pipped United to the title in the last game of the season, with both teams going into their final games level on points. In 2013, United finished 11 points clear to clinch their 20th title. City finished 19 points clear in 2018, breaking a record set by United in the 1999–2000 season. Seven semi-finals (two in the FA Cup and five in the League Cup) have been played between both clubs, but they have never met in the final of any senior competition.

Table correct as of 26 February 2023.

(*) Charity/Community Shields includes shared honours after a drawn match, as per competition regulations prior to 1993. Manchester United has 17 outright and 4 shared titles.

Non-competitive derbies
A large number of non-competitive Manchester derbies have taken place, including the first match between the two sides' precursors, Newton Heath and St Mark's, in November 1881. The majority of these occurred during the Second World War, when a total of 44 matches were played between the teams. In recent years, non-competitive matches between the teams have generally been testimonials, such as those for Paul Lake and Denis Irwin. In 1978, for Colin Bell's testimonial, players from City and United lined up side by side against a combined Liverpool and Everton team in a Manchester v Merseyside fixture.

Matches between non-first-team sides representing the Manchester clubs also have an element of rivalry, with occasions when the reserve teams meet sometimes referred to as "mini-derbies". This term is also used in reference to when supporters' offshoot clubs (Maine Road F.C. and F.C. United of Manchester) meet. The two clubs have met twice, in the 2006–07 season, with FC United winning the inaugural match 2–1 away at Bower Fold, Stalybridge, in front of 3,181 spectators. United also won the second game 3–0 at Gigg Lane, Bury in a game watched by 3,605. A friendly in 2009 saw Maine Road win . F.C. United's games against Salford City have also been referred to as a "mini Manchester derby", especially since Salford's takeover by the Class of '92.

A friendly match played on 20 July 2017 in Houston, Texas, United States marked the first Manchester derby to be contested outside the United Kingdom. The match, part of the 2017 International Champions Cup, ended with United winning 2–0 in front of 67,401 spectators. A Manchester derby had been scheduled to take place in Beijing, China a year earlier as part of the 2016 International Champions Cup, but was cancelled due to extreme weather conditions.

All-time results

League

Cup

The first meeting between the sides in a national competition occurred in the first qualifying round of the 1891–92 FA Cup. In their early years the Manchester clubs sometimes regarded the FA Cup as a low priority. In the previous season Newton Heath named a reserve team for their tie against Bootle, and Ardwick withdrew from their second round tie at Haliwell, opting to play a friendly against Higher Walton instead.<ref>Toovey, Manchester City – The Birth of the Blues 1880–1894, p. 109.</ref> This time both clubs treated the match as a senior fixture. Newton Heath won 5–1 at North Road.

The second FA Cup derby was a far more prestigious occasion – a semi-final at Sheffield United's Bramall Lane in 1926. City won 3–0, but were beaten in the final by Bolton Wanderers. 29 years later City overcame United 2–0 in the Fourth Round, and again reached the final only to be runners-up.

The first League Cup derby was in the 1969–70 season. City won a two-legged semi-final 4–3 on aggregate, and this win went on to win the competition. One month later the teams met once more, in the FA Cup Fourth Round. United avenged their earlier defeat with a 3–0 win. The clubs met in the League Cup twice more in the 1970s, both in the fourth round. In 1974–75 United won 1–0 at Old Trafford. This match is the only competitive derby to have occurred while the clubs were in different divisions. Manchester United were in the Second Division, having been relegated the previous season. The following season the teams met in the competition again, with United a First Division team once more. City won 4–0 at Maine Road, and went on to win the competition. However, the match also saw Colin Bell suffer a knee injury that eventually led to his retirement.

In the 34 years following City's triumph in 1975, only three cup fixtures occurred perhaps symbolising City's worst decline of their 130-year history. All three cup fixtures were in the FA Cup, all at Old Trafford and all won by United. The only cup derby of the 1980s was a 1–0 United win in the 1987 FA Cup Third Round. The next cup meeting was at Old Trafford in 1996, was decided by a hotly disputed penalty for United, described by The Independent as "like prosecuting someone for littering during a riot". Eight years later the next cup meeting was at Old Trafford in the FA Cup with United emerging victorious in an eventful 4–2 victory which saw Gary Neville sent-off for head-butting Steve McManaman.

Shared player history

Players who have played for both clubs
The first transfers of note between the clubs occurred in 1906. During the 1905–06 season City became embroiled in a financial scandal, which resulted in the suspension of seventeen players, including most of the team that had won the 1904 FA Cup Final. United signed four of these players: Billy Meredith, Sandy Turnbull, Herbert Burgess and Jimmy Bannister. All four were subsequently part of the team which won United's first major trophy, the 1908 league championship.

Scottish striker Denis Law had several spells with City sandwiching an eleven-year spell with United which saw him become a club legend between 1962 and 1973. In 1974 he scored the winner for City at Old Trafford in a game that condemned United to relegation, Law did not celebrate the goal and walked off the field with his head down when substituted.

Brian Kidd began his career with United in 1967 and went on to make 203 appearances before leaving in 1974. Two years later he joined City and made 98 appearances over a three-year stretch. Following retirement, Kidd became assistant manager to Sir Alex Ferguson at United and won four Premier League titles and numerous domestic trophies, in 2009 he became Mark Hughes assistant at City and would remain in the position under the next three managers serving as assistant manager to Roberto Mancini, Manuel Pellegrini before leaving Pep Guardiola's coaching staff at the end of the 2020–21 season, having won numerous titles with City.

During the 1980s to early 2000s when the gulf between the two clubs was arguably at its biggest the majority of players who had played for both were largely former United youngsters such as Shaun Goater, Jonathan Macken and Terry Cooke who had moved across to City either directly or later in their career, or former United club legends such as Peter Schmeichel, Andy Cole and Andrei Kanchelskis who had joined City towards the end of their respected playing careers. Midway through the 1995–96 season United signed City goalkeeper Tony Coton who recently lost his place in the Blues team, he lasted six months at Old Trafford but failed to make a single appearance for the Reds before joining Sunderland in the summer.

In recent years, direct transfers between the clubs have been rare as both sides are now Premier League title challengers. Carlos Tevez joined City in 2009 having spent the previous two seasons at United. City then produced billboard posters featuring Tevez and the slogan "Welcome to Manchester". Tevez had been a first-team regular and had won a variety of trophies under Sir Alex Ferguson and later went on to captain to City in their 2011 FA Cup triumph as well as playing a part in helping the Blues win their first Premier League title in 2012.

In 2012, United signed defender Frederic Veseli from City midway through the 2011–12 season, with the player disappointed that he was unable to break into Roberto Mancini's first team. He would eventually leave United in 2013 having failed to make any first team appearances for either Manchester side over a three-year period.

On 23 July 2021, United confirmed the signing of former City EDS player Jadon Sancho from Borussia Dortmund for £73 million. In 2017 Sancho had been omitted from City's pre-season squad as he was seen to be trying to engineer a move away from the club, He later rejected a new contract from City and moved to Dortmund in order to chase more first-team opportunities without ever making a first-team appearance at City.

Played for one, managed the other

Matt Busby made more than 200 appearances for Manchester City in the 1920s and 1930s, winning an FA Cup medal in 1934. Immediately after the Second World War, Busby became Manchester United manager, completely transforming the club in a 24-year tenure. With United he won a European Cup, five league titles and two FA Cups, and rebuilt the team after eight players were killed in the Munich air disaster in 1958.

Steve Coppell played over 300 games as a right winger for United, winning the FA Cup in 1977. He became City manager in 1996, but resigned after only 32 days, becoming the shortest serving manager in the club's history.

Managed both clubs
Ernest Mangnall is the only man to have managed both clubs. He oversaw United's first national trophy wins, gaining two league titles and one FA Cup. In September 1912, Mangnall agreed to join City, but remained in charge of United for two more games. His final match in charge of United was a derby, which his new employers City won 1–0. He signed Billy Meredith for United from City in 1906, and did the same again in 1921, but in the opposite direction. Off the field, he played an important role in both United's move to Old Trafford in 1910 and City's move to Maine Road in 1923.

Women's football
Despite prior meetings between various teams with some level of affiliation to their respective clubs, the first meeting between the clubs' two professional direct affiliate senior women's teams was on the opening weekend of the 2019–20 FA WSL season. Following Manchester United's promotion from the FA Women's Championship in their debut season, both Manchester clubs had professional senior women's football teams in the same league for the first time with Manchester City having been in the division since 2014. The teams had not met in either domestic cup competition the season prior so the first derby between the sides was United's first ever WSL game. In response to the record viewing figures during the 2019 FIFA Women's World Cup, it was announced on 8 July 2019 that the fixture will be played at the City of Manchester Stadium instead of the much smaller Academy Stadium the women's team usually plays at. The game set a new FA WSL attendance record of 31,213.

HonoursTable correct as of 5 March 2022.

Statistics

All-time results
League

Cup

Shared player history
With no senior team at Manchester United following their disbandment in 2005 shortly after Malcolm Glazer's completed takeover, it was not uncommon for players coming up through Manchester United's academy to join one of United's North West rivals, including Manchester City. Northern Ireland international Lynda Shepherd and England international Izzy Christiansen are two such examples of Manchester United academy products that departed when United did not have a women's team and subsequently played professionally for Manchester City.

With the establishment of a professional team in 2018, Ella Toone was the first player to make professional appearances for both clubs, having joined Manchester City from United in 2016 before returning for United's debut season. Fran Bentley was the other member of Manchester United's inaugural squad to join from City having also originally moved from United although she never made a senior appearance for City. In preparation for their first WSL campaign, Manchester United signed two former-City players with no previous affiliation to United: Abbie McManus joined directly from City while Jane Ross joined from West Ham United where she had spent the previous season following her departure from City. In September 2020, former United captain Alex Greenwood joined City following a one-year spell with French side Lyon, the first to join City after appearing for United. The following summer, Aoife Mannion joined United having been released by City after an injury-struck two-year spell.

Players who have played for both clubs

Notes

References
Bibliography

Notes

External links
Manchester: A City United at FIFA.com
Derby with more history than antipathy at independent.co.uk''

Manchester City F.C.
Manchester United F.C.
Football in Greater Manchester
England football derbies
1881 establishments in England
Recurring sporting events established in 1881